Neveh Erez, also known as Mitzpe Erez, is an Israeli outpost in the West Bank. Located near Ma'ale Mikhmas, it falls under the jurisdiction of the Mateh Binyamin Regional Council. It is home to around 8 families.

The outpost was established in 1999, but was vacated several times before being made permanent in 2001. It was named after Erez Gerstein, an IDF commander killed in Lebanon.

Israeli outposts are illegal under Israeli law. The international community further considers all Israeli settlements, including outposts, in the West Bank illegal under international law, but the Israeli government disputes this.

History
Neveh Erez was established in 1999.

In 1999 the Yesha Council made an agreement with then Prime Minister Ehud Barak to dismantle a number of illegal outposts, among them Neveh Erez.  In October of that year residents from Neveh Erez and Mitzpe Hagit moved to Mitzpe Dani, planning to remain there until permits allowing them to return were issued.

References

Further reading

Israeli settlements in the West Bank
Populated places established in 1999
Mateh Binyamin Regional Council
1999 establishments in the Palestinian territories

he:מאחזים#נווה ארז
Unauthorized Israeli settlements
Israeli outposts